Bruce Franklin Allen (August 17, 1917 – April 13, 1986) was a Republican, and served in the California State Assembly from 1953 through 1963. As a legislator, he authored AB700 (1959) that provided a method to grade gasoline for the purpose of informing motorists. From 1966 to 1984, he was a Santa Clara Superior Court Judge. He served in the United States Army during World War II.

References

1917 births
1986 deaths
United States Army personnel of World War II
20th-century American politicians
Republican Party members of the California State Assembly